Sigismondo Coccapani (1585 - 1643) was an Italian painter of the Baroque period. Born in Florence, he studied under Ludovico Cigoli in Rome, before returning to his native city.

Life
Coccapani was born at Florence in 1585. He at first studied literature and mathematics, but abandoned them for painting, becoming a pupil of  Ludovico Cigoli in Rome where he assisted him on his work at Santa Maria Maggiore in 1610–13. Using his scientific background he showed Cigoli, who was making a record of solar activity for his friend Galileo, how to observe and record sunspots through a method of projection. Coccapani also studied architecture with Bernardo Buontalenti. Most of his work as an independent artist was done in Florence, where he died  in 1643.

His drawing style was heavily indebted to that of  his teacher, and some drawings once thought to be by Cigoli are now attributed to Coccapani. He and his brother Giovanni made a collection of drawings by Cigoli and his circle, many of which eventually passed into the collection of the Uffizi.

References

Sources

Attribution:
 

1585 births
1643 deaths
Painters from Florence
16th-century Italian painters
Italian male painters
17th-century Italian painters